The 2001 Nevada Wolf Pack football team represented the University of Nevada, Reno during the 2001 NCAA Division I-A football season. Nevada competed as a member of the Western Athletic Conference (WAC). The Wolf Pack were led by second–year head coach Chris Tormey and played their home games at Mackay Stadium.

Schedule

Game summaries

at BYU

at Colorado State

Hawaii

UNLV

Louisiana Tech

at Rice

at Boise State

SMU

at San Jose State

Fresno State

at UTEP

Notes

References

Nevada
Nevada Wolf Pack football seasons
Nevada Wolf Pack football